Events in the year 2013 in the State of Palestine.

Incumbents
State of Palestine (UN observer non-member State)
 President – Mahmoud Abbas (PLO)
 Prime Minister – Salam Fayyad (Third Way) (emergency rule)
 Prime Minister of the Palestinian National Authority (in the Gaza Strip) – Ismail Haniyeh (Hamas) (in rebellion against the Palestinian administration in Ramallah)

Events

January 
 January 4 – Hundreds of thousands of people rally in Gaza in a show of unity between the governing Hamas and Fatah.
 January 6 – Mahmoud Abbas, the President of the Palestinian National Authority, orders that the words "State of Palestine" be used on official documents.

February 
 February 26 – A rocket is fired from the Gaza Strip into Israel, marking the first such attack since a ceasefire was signed in November 2012.

March 
 March 20 – President of the United States Barack Obama begins a four-day visit to Israel, the Palestinian territories and Jordan.

April 
 April 2 - The Palestinian Islamic organization Hamas re-elects Khaled Meshaal as its leader. The group also passes a new law ordering gender segregation in Gaza's schools that will go into effect in September.
 April 13 - Salam Fayyad resigns as Prime Minister of the Palestinian National Authority following an ongoing dispute with the President Mahmoud Abbas.
 April 30 - An Israeli air strike on Gaza City kills Hitham Maskhal, a well known Palestinian militant and injures another in the first such attack since the November ceasefire. Both suspected Palestinian militants were part of the militant group which fired rockets at the southern Israeli city of Eilat two weeks ago.

June 
 June 23 - Mahmoud Abbas, the President of the Palestinian National Authority, accepts the resignation of Prime Minister Rami Hamdallah who had offered his resignation on Thursday.

July 
 July 28 - As a "good will gesture" to restart peace talks with the Palestinian Authority, Israel agreed to release 104 Palestinian prisoners, most of whom have been in jail since before the 1993 Oslo Accords.

August 
 August 7 - Palestinian journalist Mohamed Muna is arrested and put in administrative detention.

Notable deaths
 January 29 – Said al-Muragha, 86, Palestinian militant (Fatah al-Intifada), cancer.
 March 17 – Umm Nidal, 64, Palestinian politician, multiple organ failure.
 April 2 – Maysara Abu Hamdiya, 64, Palestinian general, cancer.
 May 17 – Nasser al-Din al-Nashashibi, 93, Palestinian historian, author and journalist.

See also
2013 in Israel
Timeline of the Israeli–Palestinian conflict in 2013

References

 
State of Palestine
Years of the 21st century in the State of Palestine
2010s in the State of Palestine
State of Palestine